Oberto Cantone (Genova, 16th century) was an Italian mathematician.

Life 

He was a professor in Naples. He is well-known for his works about the use of maths in the business field, in particular "L'uso pratico dell'artimetica", printed in Naples in 1599, which is inspired by the work of Pietro Borghi.

Works

References 

Scientists from Genoa
16th-century Italian mathematicians
Year of birth missing
Year of death missing
Academic staff of the University of Naples Federico II